8T or 8-T may refer to:

8T, IATA code for Air Tindi
Mi-8T; see Mil Mi-8
FDL-8T; see List of GE reciprocating engines
Line 8T; see Batong Line, Beijing Subway
YF9F-8T; see Grumman F-9 Cougar
J-8T; see Shenyang J-8
Typ 8T, internal designation for Audi A5
OnePlus 8T, an Android smartphone

See also
T8 (disambiguation)